She's Come Undone is the 1992 debut novel by Wally Lamb. The novel was selected as the fourth book for Oprah's Book Club in December 1996. Lamb's novel was named a finalist for the 1992 Los Angeles Book Awards' Art Seidenbaum Prize for first fiction. She's Come Undone has been translated into eighteen languages.

Plot summary
Dolores Price is heartbroken when her father leaves her mother, Bernice, and their suburban home for another woman. Dolores and her mother must subsequently move into her overbearing grandmother's house in Easterly, Rhode Island. Here she attends a Catholic high school, and finds herself lonely and unable to fit into the established social hierarchy. After being raped by a neighbor who preys on her vulnerable state, Dolores turns to food and television for comfort. 

Following the accidental death of her mother, Dolores decides to attend the academically underwhelming Merton College in Pennsylvania. There Dolores is ridiculed for her weight and cultivates a secret obsession with her roommate's long-distance boyfriend, Dante, who sends love letters and nude photos in the mail. After an ill-conceived one-night stand with Dottie, the university's lesbian custodian, she takes a long cab ride to Cape Cod, where she witnesses a beached whale dying. She feels kinship with the animal and wades into the water to drown herself.

After her suicide attempt, Dolores is institutionalized for seven years in Newport, Rhode Island at Gracewood. Here she begins to work through her issues with the help of her therapist. She loses over 100 pounds, but becomes frustrated with the slow-moving therapy. She decides to move to Vermont upon release from the institution, having located Dante, the former object of her infatuation, there.

Dolores gets a job at a local grocery store and moves into an apartment across the hallway from Dante. He is working as a high school English teacher, but is frustrated with the stagnation in his life after having given up his childhood dream of becoming a priest. The two begin a relationship, and eventually marry. However, Dante continues to dominate Dolores and has affairs with his female students. When Dolores becomes pregnant (something she dearly wanted), Dante pressures her into getting an abortion. After the loss of her baby, Dolores becomes resentful of the control Dante exerts over her life. After her grandmother, Thelma, dies, she admits to Dante that she orchestrated their entire relationship after becoming infatuated with him through his photos. They divorce and Dolores leaves. She moves into her late grandmother's house, which she has inherited. 

At her grandmother's funeral, Dolores is able to reconnect with several friends from her past, who form a surrogate family for her in Easterly. They encourage her to pursue her dreams, and she enrolls in some college courses while working. Here she meets Thayer, a single father, who is immediately smitten with her despite her troubled past. Initially Dolores rebuffs his advances, but is charmed when he sends his teenage son to recite a rap about how much he likes her. They begin a tentative romance, predicated on Dolores's desire to have a child. Dolores realizes that for the first time, she has a partner in her life whom she can trust and who will treat her as an equal. Thayer supports her as she receives IVF treatment, but they do not have enough money for a second attempt after the first one fails.

By now, Dolores is in her late 30s and is depressed by the idea that she will never be a mother. Thayer, now her husband, takes her on a whale watching vacation to help her feel better.  While on the boat, Dolores muses about her past and future. Dolores decides that her life, as it is now, is wonderful and is enough. The novel ends with her being the only one to see a whale breach the ocean, symbolizing her newfound peace.

Characters 
Dolores Price: protagonist.
Bernice Holland (Ma): Dolores' mother.
Tony: Dolores' father.
Thelma Holland: Dolores' maternal grandmother, lives in Easterly, Rhode Island. 
Katherine (Kippy) Strednicki: Dolores' roommate at Merton College, in Pennsylvania. 
Dante Davis: Kippy's long-distance boyfriend, Dolores' college infatuation, and eventual first husband. 
Dotty: The university custodian Dolores has a sexual encounter with. 
Thayer Kitchen: Dolores' second husband. 
Jack Speight: A neighbor living in Dolores' grandmother's third-floor apartment with his wife, Rita. 
Roberta Jaskiewicz: Owner/manager of the Peacock Tattoo Emporium in her grandmother's neighborhood. One of Dolores' only friends in Easterly, Rhode Island.  
Fabio Pucci: Dolores' high school guidance counselor. 
Gary: Mr. Pucci's lover who is dying of AIDS. 
Dr. Shaw: Dolores' psychotherapist at Gracewood. 
Larry and Ruth Rosenfarb: Dolores' grandmother hires Larry to put up wallpaper after Bernice dies, Ruth is Larry's wife.

Minor Characters 
Jeanette Nord: A friend of Dolores'. They like the same television show. 
Norma French: A schoolmate of Dolores' whose boyfriend has a bad attitude. 
Rochelle, Veronica, Naomi: Dolores' dorm-mates in college. 
Domingos: Taxi driver who drives Dolores to Cape Cod. 
The Buchbinders: The couple that hires Dolores to work in their store after the death of her grandmother.

Awards and nominations
Oprah's Book Club selection for December 1996.
New York Times notable book of the year.

References 

 Lamb, Wally. She's Come Undone. Publisher: Simon & Schuster, 

1992 American novels